Peristeri Stadium (also known as the Atromitos Stadium) is a multi-purpose stadium in Peristeri, a western district of Athens, Greece.

It is currently used mostly for football matches and is the home stadium of Atromitos.

The stadium was built in 1947 and has a seating capacity of 10,050.

References

External links
 Peristeri Stadium profile at Stadia.gr
 atromitosfc.gr

Buildings and structures completed in 1970
Football venues in Greece
Multi-purpose stadiums in Greece
Venues of the 2004 Summer Olympics